74 Miles Away is an album by jazz saxophonist Cannonball Adderley recorded "live" before an invited audience at Capitol Studios in Hollywood, California in 1967, and features performances by Adderley with Nat Adderley, Joe Zawinul, Victor Gaskin and Roy McCurdy. Following these sessions, it would be almost a year before Cannonball Adderley recorded again, a significant sign that the slump in jazz fortunes of the later 1960s had begun.

Reception
The Allmusic review by Richard S. Ginell awarded the album 4 stars and states "This was a rare thing, a group that could grab the public's attention and gently lead them into more difficult idioms without pandering or condescension".

Track listing

Tracks 1 & 3 recorded on June 12, 1967. Tracks 2,4,& 5 recorded July 24, 1967 at Capitol Tower, Hollywood

Personnel
Cannonball Adderley – alto saxophone
Nat Adderley – cornet, vocal on "Oh Babe"
Joe Zawinul – keyboards
Victor Gaskin – bass
Roy McCurdy – drums

References

1967 live albums
Capitol Records live albums
Cannonball Adderley live albums
Albums produced by David Axelrod (musician)

Albums recorded at Capitol Studios